Malai is a type of clotted cream used in the cuisine of the Indian subcontinent.

Malai may also refer to:

 Malai District, Cambodia
 Malai (commune), a commune in the district
 Malai Gas Field, a natural gas field in Turkmenistan
 Nick Malai (born 1987), Albanian professional pool player
 Litsea garciae, a tree native to Asia locally called malai

Other